René Rensch (born 18 March 1969 in Kyritz) is a German rowing cox.

References 
 
 

1969 births
Living people
Rowers at the 1988 Summer Olympics
Olympic silver medalists for East Germany
Olympic rowers of East Germany
Coxswains (rowing)
Olympic medalists in rowing
East German male rowers
Medalists at the 1988 Summer Olympics
People from Kyritz
Sportspeople from Brandenburg